A Lover's Romance or Romance for Lovers is a 1974 Soviet musical romantic drama directed by Andrei Konchalovsky.

Plot
Sergei and Tanya are in love with each other. Sergei is drafted into the marine corps and Tania waits for his return. Sergei's division is abandoned in favor of helping local residents in distress. During the operation, his armored personnel gets carried into the sea. His relatives receive a notice of his death. Tanya's loving childhood friend, a hockey player, helps her to cope with misfortune and she marries him.

But it turned out that Sergei did not perish. He, together with a wounded friend he saved, are found on a deserted island after a long winter. Back home, Sergei learns that Tanya has married another. Unable to accept the loss of his beloved, Sergei dies; but this death is a symbolic and emotional one, not physical. Sergei continues to live a normal life without shock and strong distress, meets another girl, marries her, has a child. In the finale there is a spiritual rebirth of the hero.

Cast
Yevgeny Kindinov as Sergei Nikitin (vocals by Alexander Gradsky)
Yelena Koreneva as  Tanya (vocals by Zoya Kharabadze)
Irina Kupchenko as Lyuda (vocals by Valentina Tolkunova)
Innokenty Smoktunovsky as  Trumpeter (vocals by Vladimir Siskin)
Elizaveta Solodova as Sergei's mother
Iya Savvina as Tanya's mother
Vladimir Konkin as Sergei's younger brother
Aleksandr Zbruyev as Igor Volgin
Roman Gromadsky as Ensign Ivan Solovyov
Nikolai Grinko as Vice-Admiral
Ivan Ryzhov as Vasiliy
Alexander Samoilov as Sergei's middle brother
Ekaterina Mazurova as Tanya's grandmother

Awards
In 1974 the film received the Crystal Globe at the Karlovy Vary International Film Festival.

References

External links
 

1974 romantic drama films
1970s musical drama films
Soviet romantic drama films
Soviet musical drama films
Films directed by Andrei Konchalovsky
Russian romantic drama films
Mosfilm films
1974 films